Burns Glacier is a tributary glacier,  long, flowing north along the east side of Pinckard Table to enter the southwest side of Tinker Glacier, in Victoria Land. It was mapped by the United States Geological Survey from surveys and from U.S. Navy air photos, 1955–63, and named by the Advisory Committee on Antarctic Names for John P. Burns, a radioman with the McMurdo Station winter parties of 1963 and 1967.

References 

Glaciers of Borchgrevink Coast